Evgeny Donskoy was the defending champion but chose not to defend his title.

Max Purcell won the title after defeating Jay Clarke 3–6, 6–4, 7–6(8–6) in the final.

Seeds

Draw

Finals

Top half

Bottom half

References

External links
Main draw
Qualifying draw

President's Cup - 1
2021 Men's Singles